María Teresa Herrera Tello (born October 15, 1956 in Santiago, Nuevo León) is a Mexican lawyer. She served in the cabinet of President Vicente Fox as Secretary of Agrarian Reform (2000 – 2003).

Life
She was born on October 15, 1956 in Santiago, Nuevo León.

Herrera Tello graduated as a valedictorian with a bachelor's degree in law from the Autonomous University of Nuevo León.

She was the first woman in the history of Nuevo León to become a magistrate in the state's Superior Court of Justice (in Spanish: Tribunal Superior de Justicia de Nuevo León). Eventually she presided over the court and was reelected four consecutive times.

She served as Secretary of Agrarian Reform (Secretaria de la Reforma Agraria) from December 1, 2000 until April 5, 2003, when she was appointed legal councilor to the Mexican president. On November 18, 2004 she was appointed councilor to the Federal Judicature Council (Consejo de la Judicatura Federal).

References

1956 births
Living people
20th-century Mexican judges
21st-century Mexican lawyers
Autonomous University of Nuevo León alumni
Mexican Secretaries of the Agrarian Reform
People from Santiago, Nuevo León
Women Secretaries of State of Mexico
Mexican women judges
20th-century women judges